Marino Caracciolo (1468 – 28 January 1538) was a Neapolitan cardinal and diplomat in the service of Emperor Charles V.

Born in Naples into one of the most important families in the Kingdom of Naples, he spent his youth and was educated under the tutelage of Cardinal Ascanio Sforza at the court of Milan. Ambassador of Duke Massimiliano Sforza to the Papal court in 1513 he was created an Apostolic Protonotary in 1515; in the same year he took part as orator of the Duke of Milan to the V Lateran Council.

In 1518 he was appointed Papal Nuncio to Spain and in 1519 Nuncio before the Diet of Augsburg. At the Diet of Worms in 1520 he worked with Cardinal Girolamo Aleandro against Martin Luther.

After the election of Emperor Charles V he entered into his service and was ambassador to England and to Venice. In 1524 he was created Bishop of Catania, but resigned three times in favour of other members of his family. In the same year he was enfeoffed with large estates in the Duchy of Milan (County of Vespolate 1524–1530, County of Gallarate 1530). He was created a Cardinal of the Holy Roman Church by Pope Paul III on 21 May 1535, but his name was not announced publicly (it was held in pectore by the Pope).  He was welcomed at the Papal Court and received his red hat on 12 November 1535, and on 15 November given the gold ring and granted the title of Cardinal Deacon of Santa Maria in Aquiro.

In 1536 he was appointed by Charles V Governor of Milan but he only held power on civil and economic matters, the military power being given to Alfonso d'Avalos.

He is buried in the Duomo of Milan; his funeral monument is attributed to Agostino Busti, known as Bambaia.

References

Sources

1468 births
1538 deaths
Clergy from Naples
16th-century Italian cardinals
Bishops of Catania
Nobility from Naples
16th-century Italian Roman Catholic bishops
Burials at Milan Cathedral
Marino
Diplomats from Naples